Olivier Auriac (born 14 September 1983) is a retired French professional footballer who played as a midfielder.

Career
In May 2016, it was announced that Auriac would retire at the end of the 2015–16 season. Having joined Angers in 2007, he captained the team and played a total of 267 matches for the club.

References

External links

frenchleague.com

1983 births
Living people
Association football midfielders
French footballers
FC Girondins de Bordeaux players
Stade Brestois 29 players
Angers SCO players
Ligue 1 players
Ligue 2 players
France youth international footballers